Korean noodles are noodles or noodle dishes in Korean cuisine, and are collectively referred to as "guksu" in native Korean or "myeon" in hanja character. Preparations with noodles are relatively simple and dates back to around BC 6000 to BC 5000 in Asia. In Korea, traditional noodle dishes are onmyeon (beef broth-based noodle soup), called guksu jangguk (noodles with a hot clear broth), naengmyeon (cold buckwheat noodles), bibim guksu (cold noodle dish mixed with vegetables), kalguksu (knife-cut noodles), kongguksu (noodles with a cold soybean broth) among others. In royal court, baekmyeon (literally "white noodles") consisting of buckwheat noodles and pheasant broth, was regarded as the top quality noodle dish. Naengmyeon, with a cold soup mixed with dongchimi (watery radish kimchi) and beef brisk broth, was eaten in court during summer.

Noodles by ingredients

 Dangmyeon (당면; cellophane noodles) - made from sweet potato starch
 Memil guksu (메밀국수) - buckwheat noodles similar to Japanese soba noodles
 Gogi-guksu (고기국수) - Noodle soup of Jeju Province made with sliced pork
 Olchaengi guksu (올챙이국수) - noodles made from dried corn flour which are eaten in mountainous places such as Gangwon Province
 Gamja guksu (감자국수) - noodles made from a mixture of potato starch, rice flour, and glutinous rice flour
 Gamjanongma guksu (감자농마국수) - noodles made from potato starch that have a very chewy texture. It is a local specialty of Hwanghae Province
 Milguksu (밀국수) - wheat flour noodles. While noodles were eaten in Korea from ancient times, productions of wheat was less than that of other crops, so wheat noodles did not become a daily food until 1945.
 Dotori guksu (도토리 국수)- noodles made from acorn flour
 Chilk guksu (칡국수) - noodles made from kudzu and buckwheat
 Ssuk kalguksu (쑥칼국수) - noodles made from Artemisia princeps and wheat flour
 Hobak guksu (호박국수) - noodles made from pumpkin and wheat flour
 Kkolttu guksu (꼴뚜국수) - noodles made from buckwheat flour and wheat flour
 Cheonsachae (천사채) - half-transparent noodlesphoto made from the jelly-like extract left after steaming kelp, without the addition of grain flour or starch. The taste is bland, so they are generally eaten as a light salad after seasoned or served as a garnish beneath saengseon hoe (sliced raw fish). Cheonsachae has a chewy texture and is low in calories.

Noodle dishes

Banchan
 Japchae - Sweet potato noodles (cellophane noodles) stir-fried with thinly sliced beef and vegetables; it may be served either hot or cold.

Warm noodle soups

 Janchi guksu - wheat flour noodles in a light broth made with anchovy and optionally kelp or beef broth. It is served with a sauce made with sesame oil, soy sauce, scallions and a small amount of chili pepper powder. Thinly sliced jidan (지단), or fried egg, gim, and zucchini are topped on the dish for garnish. The name is derived from the word janchi (잔치, feast or banquet) in Korean because the dish was specialty foods for birthdays, weddings or auspicious occasions because the long, continuous shape was thought to be associated with the bliss for longevity and long-lasting marriage.
 Kalguksu - knife-cut wheat flour noodles served in a large bowl with seafood-based broth and other ingredients
 Gomguksu (곰국수) - wheat flour noodles in a broth of gomguk or gomtang which is made from boiling beef bones or cartilage.
 Jjamppong (짬뽕) - wheat flour noodles in a spicy broth including vegetables and seafood.
 Jjapaguri (ram-don)

Cool noodle dishes

 Bibim guksu - thin wheat flour noodles served with a spicy sauce made from gochujang and vinegar. Half a hard-boiled egg, thinly sliced cucumber, and sometimes chopped kimchi are added as garnishes.

 Makguksu - buckwheat noodle soup, especially popular in Gangwon-do province and its capital city, Chuncheon
 Naengmyeon - thin buckwheat noodles either served in a cold soup or served with a gochujang-based sauce; the noodles and other vegetable ingredients are stirred together by the diner. It is originally a winter dish, and a local specialty of the Ibuk region (이북지방, nowadays the area of North Korea).
 Mul naengmyeon - literally "water cold noodles." It is served in a bowl of a tangy cold to lukewarm soup, not typically served as cold as its South Korean counterparts, made with beef broth or dongchimi. Vinegar or mustard sauce can be added to taste.
 Bibim naengmyeon - literally "mixed cold noodles." It is served with no broth but mixed with the spicy, tangy sauce called chogochujang, made from gochujang, vinegar, and sugar.
 Jjolmyeon (쫄면) - similar to bibim naengmyeon but the noodles are more chewy. It is a representative dish of Incheon
 Milmyeon (밀면) - A dish unique to Busan, derived from naengmyeon
 Kongguksu (콩국수) - wheat flour noodles in a bowl of cold soy milk broth
 Jatguksu (잣국수) - wheat flour or buckwheat noodles in a bowl of cold broth made from ground pine nuts and water. It is a local specialty of Gapyeong, Gyeonggi Province. The recipe is quite similar to kongguksu, but the dish has cleaner and more savory taste.
 Dongchimi guksu (동치미국수) - wheat or buckwheat noodles in a bowl of cold dongchimi.

See also

 Chinese noodles
 Japanese noodles
 Korean cuisine
 Vietnamese cuisine
 List of noodles
 List of noodle dishes
 Noodle soup

References

External links